C. P. Cumberbatch (22 November 1882 – 15 February 1922) was a Trinidadian cricketer. He played in ten first-class matches for Trinidad and Tobago from 1909 to 1922. During the West Indies 1906 tour to England, C. P. Cumberbatch was sometimes confused with Archie Cumberbatch. It was only in 2000 that much of the confusion concerning these two men was resolved by Ray Goble and Keith Sandiford.

See also
 List of Trinidadian representative cricketers

References

External links
 

1882 births
1922 deaths
Trinidad and Tobago cricketers